Scottish Nuclear was formed as a precursor to the privatisation of the electricity supply industry in Scotland on 1 April 1990. A purpose-built headquarters was built in 1992 in the new town of East Kilbride.

It consisted of the nuclear assets of the South of Scotland Electricity Board, which were later absorbed into the 1996 founded companies - Magnox Electric and British Energy.

Assets
Hunterston A Magnox Power Station (by then shut down)
Hunterston B AGR Power Station
Torness AGR Power Station

History

Background : before 1990

In the late 1980s, the 1955-founded South of Scotland Electricity Board (SSEB), was one of the two major electricity generation and transmission companies in Scotland; other being North of Scotland Hydro-Electric Board (now SSE plc). The SSEB generated, transmitted and distributed electricity throughout the south of Scotland, including the former regions of Strathclyde, Lothian, Fife, Central, Borders and Dumfries and Galloway and a few towns in northern England.

Scottish Nuclear : 1990-1996

On 1 April 1990, the nuclear generation assets (Hunterston A, Hunterston B and Torness Power Stations) of SSEB were vested with a new private company - Scottish Nuclear. The chairman of the company was Sir James Hann.

The remainder of the SSEB assets were privatised as Scottish Power in 1991.

Breakup : 1996 

In 1996, the older Magnox reactor - Hunterston A was transferred to Magnox Electric - established to own and operate a proportion of the old Magnox nuclear stations of Nuclear Electric. The assets of Magnox Electric were later combined with BNFL in 1998, and eventually operated and managed by US based EnergySolutions through its June 2007 acquisition of the BFNL subsidiary - Reactor Sites Management Company.

The remaining two advanced 'AGR' nuclear plant assets of the company were combined with the assets of Nuclear Electric; and became a part of the newly formed and soon to be privatised British Energy (now EDF Energy).

Through the breakup, both the companies - Scottish Nuclear and Nuclear Electric became defunct; but is still extant through a descendant company - EDF Energy.

See also
Energy policy of the United Kingdom
Energy use and conservation in the United Kingdom

References

Nuclear power companies of the United Kingdom
Electric power companies of Scotland
Defunct companies of Scotland
Defunct electric power companies of the United Kingdom
Energy in Scotland
Utilities of the United Kingdom
Former nationalised industries of the United Kingdom
Energy companies established in 1990
Non-renewable resource companies established in 1990
Non-renewable resource companies disestablished in 1996
Nuclear power in Scotland
1990 establishments in Scotland
1996 disestablishments in Scotland